Thy Disease is a Polish industrial metal band from Kraków. Their lyrics generally deal with nihilism, apocalypse, and war. The band was formed in 1999, by musicians formerly active in bands like Sceptic, Anal Stench, and Crionics.

Their fourth album, Rat Age (Sworn Kinds Final Verses), was released in early 2006 under Empire Records. The band's label for the previous three albums was Metal Mind Productions.

Band members

Timeline

Discography 
 Studio albums
 Devilish Act of Creation (2001)
 Cold Skin Obsession (2002)
 Neurotic World of Guilt (2004)
 Rat Age (Sworn Kinds Final Verses) (2006)
 Anshur-Za (2009)
 Costumes of Technocracy (2014)
 7th Album (2017)

 Demos
 Art of Decadence (2000)

 Video albums
 Extreme Obsession Live (DVD/VHS, 2004)

 Music videos

References

External links 
 

Musical groups established in 1999
Polish heavy metal musical groups
Polish death metal musical groups
Mystic Production artists
Metal Mind Productions artists
1999 establishments in Poland